Pavol Hell is a Canadian mathematician and computer scientist, born in Czechoslovakia. He is a professor of computing science at Simon Fraser University. Hell started his mathematical studies at Charles University in Prague, and moved to Canada in August 1968 after the Warsaw Pact invasion of Czechoslovakia. He obtained his MSc from McMaster University in Hamilton, under the joint supervision of Gert Sabidussi and Alex Rosa, and his PhD at the Universite de Montreal, with Gert Sabidussi. In his PhD research he pioneered, on the suggestion of Gert Sabidussi, the study of graph retracts. He describes his area of interest as "computational combinatorics", including algorithmic graph theory and complexity of graph problems. His current focus is on nicely structured graph classes, and on the complexity of various versions of graph homomorphism problems.

Hell has written the book  Graph and Homomorphisms
 with his long-term collaborator Jaroslav Nešetřil, and many highly cited papers, including "On the complexity of H-coloring"  also with Nešetřil, "On the history of the minimum spanning tree problem", with Ron Graham, "On the completeness of a generalized matching problem"
 with David Kirkpatrick, and "List homomorphisms and circular arc graphs" with Tomas Feder and Jing Huang. He is a managing editor of the Journal of Graph Theory, and was named a fellow of the Society for Industrial and Applied Mathematics (SIAM) in 2012.

References

External links 
List of publications at DBLP
Journal of Graph Theory

Year of birth missing (living people)
Living people
Czech mathematicians
Czech computer scientists
Canadian mathematicians
Canadian computer scientists
Graph theorists
McMaster University alumni
Université de Montréal alumni
Academic staff of Simon Fraser University
Fellows of the Society for Industrial and Applied Mathematics